Harun (died 1035) was the de facto ruler (later Shah) of Khwarazm from 1032 to 1035. He was the son of Altun Tash.

Following his father's death in 1032, Harun was effectively made governor of Khwarazm by the Ghaznavid sultan Mas'ud. The title of Khwarazm-Shah was not given to him, but to Mas'ud's son Sa'id; Mas'ud had been distrustful of Altun Tash and probably wanted to avoid giving his son too much power. In 1034, however, Harun revolted against Mas'ud, assuming the title of Khwarazm-Shah, and turned to the Ghaznavids' enemies, the Karakhanids of Samarkand and the Seljuks, for support. Mas'ud managed to put an end to this revolt by gaining the support of Harun's guards, who assassinated him. Khwarazm then fell to Harun's brother Ismail Khandan.

References

"Altuntas." Encyclopædia Iranica. 21 August 2006. 

1035 deaths
Khwarezmid rulers
11th-century monarchs in Asia
Year of birth unknown

de:Altuntaschiden#Harun ibn Altun-Tasch (reg. 1032–1035)